Hameln-Pyrmont – Holzminden is an electoral constituency (German: Wahlkreis) represented in the Bundestag. It elects one member via first-past-the-post voting. Under the current constituency numbering system, it is designated as constituency 46. It is located in southern Lower Saxony, comprising the Hameln-Pyrmont and Holzminden districts and a small part of the Northeim district.

Hameln-Pyrmont – Holzminden was created for the inaugural 1949 federal election. Since 2017, it has been represented by Johannes Schraps of the Social Democratic Party (SPD).

Geography
Hameln-Pyrmont – Holzminden is located in eastern Lower Saxony. As of the 2021 federal election, it comprises the district of Hameln-Pyrmont and Holzminden, as well as the municipalities of Bodenfelde and Uslar and Solling area from the Northeim district.

History
Hameln-Pyrmont – Holzminden was created in 1949, then known as Hameln – Springe. In the 1980 through 1990 elections, it was named Hameln – Holzminden. It acquired its current name in the 1994 election. In the inaugural Bundestag election, it was Lower Saxony constituency 24 in the numbering system. From 1953 through 1961, it was number 46. From 1965 through 1998, it was number 41. In the 2002 and 2005 elections, it was number 46. In the 2009 election, it was number 47. Since the 2013 election, it has been number 46.

Originally, the constituency comprised the independent city of Hameln and the districts of Hameln-Pyrmont and Springe. In the 1980 through 1998 elections, the constituency comprised the entirety of the Hameln-Pyrmont and Holzminden districts. It acquired its current borders in the 2002 election.

Members
The constituency has been held by the Social Democratic Party (SPD) during all but one Bundestag term since its creation. Its first representative was Herbert Kriedemann of the SPD, who served from 1949 to 1953. Alexander Elbrächter of the German Party (DP) won in 1953, but Heinz Frehsee of the SPD was elected in 1957. He was succeeded in 1976 by Brigitte Schulte, who served until 2005. Gabriele Lösekrug-Möller then served from 2005 to 2017. Johannes Schraps has been representative since 2017.

Election results

2021 election

2017 election

2013 election

2009 election

References

Federal electoral districts in Lower Saxony
1949 establishments in West Germany
Constituencies established in 1949
Hameln-Pyrmont
Holzminden (district)
Northeim (district)